LQ45 is a stock market index for the Indonesia Stock Exchange (IDX) (formerly known as the Jakarta Stock Exchange). The LQ45 index consists of 45 companies that:
 have been included in the top 60 companies with the highest market capitalization in the last 12 months
 have been included in the top 60 companies with the highest transaction value in a regular market in the last 12 months
 have been listed in the Indonesia Stock Exchange for at least 3 months
 have good financial conditions, prospect of growth, high transaction value and frequency

It is calculated semi-annually by the research and development division of the Indonesia Stock Exchange.

Components
For the period of August 2019 to January 2020, the LQ45 index is composed of the following companies:

References

External links
 Bloomberg page for LQ45:IND

Economy of Indonesia-related lists
Indonesia Stock Exchange
Indonesian stock market indices